The 2009 UTEP Miners football team represented the University of Texas at El Paso in the 2009 NCAA Division I FBS football season. The team's head coach was Mike Price. The Miners played their home games at the Sun Bowl Stadium in El Paso, Texas. The Miners finished the season 4–8 and 3–5 in Conference USA play. UTEP averaged 29,010 fans per game.

Recruiting
UTEP's class of 20 players includes 14 who are graduating from Texas high schools in 2009.  The most notable of these players is Darren Mickens, the nephew of NFL cornerback Ray Mickens.

Schedule

Game summaries

Buffalo

Sophomore quarterback Zach Maynard threw for 159 yards in his first career start, leading Buffalo to a 23–17 win over UTEP in the season opener for both schools on Saturday in the Sun Bowl.

Maynard's 42-yard pass to Naaman Roosevelt with 12:13 remaining in the third quarter gave the Bulls a 23–7 lead that the Miners couldn't overcome – although they did come close.

UTEP chipped away, cutting the deficit to 23–14 on a 17-yard scoring run by James Thomas with 7:37 remaining in the third period, then 23–17 on a 31-yard field goal by Logan Barrett with 5:45 to play.

The Miners got the ball back following a defensive stop and drove 60 yards to the Buffalo 20-yard line with under a half–minute remaining. Trevor Vittatoe hooked up with Thomas for the apparent tying score with 14 seconds left, but the play was nullified due to a holding penalty on offensive lineman Rod Huntley. Making matters worse, offensive lineman Lance Evbuomwan was charged with unsportsmanlike conduct for celebrating the touchdown, backing up the Miners to the 42-yard line. Vittatoe's final two pass attempts – both intended for Kris Adams – fell incomplete and the Bulls escaped El Paso with a victory.

In a twist of fate, UTEP's defense – much maligned over the last three seasons – kept the Miners in the game on a night when the offense struggled. The Bulls were held to only 309 yards on 61 plays.

But the Miners weren't sharp offensively – particularly in the first half – and were whistled for 12 penalties totaling 101 yards. Dropped balls, bad exchanges and a botched catch on a kickoff were among the culprits that did in the Miners.

Trevor Vittatoe completed 27 of 45 passes for 233 yards for the Miners, but did not throw a touchdown pass for just the third time in his college career. Adams fell two yards shy of 100 receiving, and Donald Buckram gained a career–high 108 yards on 14 rushes.

Kansas

Jake Sharp ran for 104 yards and three touchdowns while No. 24 Kansas got two big punt returns from Daymond Patterson to beat Texas-El Paso 34–7 on Saturday night.

Todd Reesing completed 25 of 41 attempts for 260 yards with one interception. He threw a 5-yard TD to Sharp and worked again with Dezmon Briscoe, who returned from a one-game suspension for violating team rules and had eight catches for 154 yards.

The Jayhawks (2–0) finished with 576 total yards and their defense racking up five sacks while holding UTEP (0–2) to negative rushing yards until the closing minutes.

The Miners, who finished with 4 yards rushing, avoided the shutout when Trevor Vittatoe found Donavon Kemp for a 75-yard catch-and-run with 12:39 remaining.

Other than a Mariachi band performance at halftime, UTEP fans didn't spend much time cheering anything.

One week after committing 12 penalties for 101 yards in an opening loss to Buffalo, UTEP was flagged 13 times for 137 yards. Vittatoe was 14-of-25 for 187 yards with one interception.

The Jayhawks weren't perfect. Reesing got off to a slow start, kicker Jacob Branstetter was 2 for 4 on field goal attempts and Kansas struggled early to convert third downs, going 3 of 9 in the first half before rebounding to finish 9 of 18.

It didn't matter.

Patterson set up a field goal with a 19-yard punt return in the second period and took another punt back 49 yards in the third just before Sharp's final TD. Sharp ran through big holes all night, and his 3-yard burst put Kansas up 27–0 midway through the third period.

The Jayhawks got rolling with a big second quarter, scoring 17 points to lead 20–0 at the break.

Sharp, who rushed for 123 yards in last week's win over Northern Colorado, scored on a 1-yard plunge, then Branstetter made a 24-yard field goal for a 13–0 lead. Reesing placed a perfect pass over Sharp's shoulder for a 5-yard TD play. That gave Reesing at least one touchdown pass in 20 straight games.

Kansas missed a chance to build the lead when Branstetter missed a 38-yard field goal attempt as the half closed.

New Mexico State

Donald Buckram ran for a career-high 113 yards as UTEP scored all five of its touchdowns on the ground in a 38–12 dismantling of NM State on Saturday night in Las Cruces.

A rain and lightning delay of nearly three hours couldn't stop the Miners from posting their 50th win in the long-running I-10 series. UTEP (1–2) secured its first victory over the Aggies (1–2) since 2006 while posting its first win of the 2009 season.

"It was an unusual start to the game," UTEP coach Mike Price said. "I thought we were more fired up and ready to play the second time than the first time (referring to the lightning delay). I was glad to see us be able to run the ball a little bit. I was a little apprehensive about playing the mud. I thought it could be an equalizer."

Buckram and Vernon Frazier both scored two rushing touchdowns for the Miners, who forced a turnover on NM State's opening possession, converted it into a TD, then withstood the long delay to score the game's next 24 points.

UTEP forced three turnovers in the game, and held the Aggies to 284 yards of total offense.

Texas

Colt McCoy and No. 2 Texas got the fast start they had been missing in recent weeks, rolling to a 40-point lead by halftime before cruising to a 64–7 win Saturday over Texas-El Paso.

McCoy passed for 286 yards and three touchdowns, two to Dan Buckner. The Longhorns (4–0) also pressured UTEP quarterback Trevor Vittatoe into five turnovers.

Freshman D.J. Monroe's first-quarter 91-yard kickoff return made him the first player in Texas history to return two kickoffs for touchdowns in a career. He also had one in Texas' opener.

This one came seconds after UTEP's Melvin Stephenson II returned an interception 49 yards for a touchdown.

McCoy was sharp after the interception with TD passes of 36 and 15 yards to Buckner and 16 yards to Jordan Shipley, as Texas built a 47–7 halftime lead. McCoy left the game after Texas' first possession of the third quarter.

Vittatoe was 7 of 21 for 38 yards with four interceptions and a fumble for UTEP (1–3).

Texas held UTEP to seven first downs and 53 total yards.

The defense did its part, pounding UTEP Quarterback Trevor Vittatoe with pass rush that forced him into several bad throws.

Sergio Kindle sacked Vittatoe on the fifth play of the game, causing a fumble that set up the Longhorns' first touchdown on a 3-yard run by Tre' Newton.

McCoy and Buckner have connected for touchdowns in three straight games and their first against UTEP made it 23–7. His scoring pass to Shipley made it 33–7 before tailback Vondrell McGee, who had lost his starting position to Newton, took a pitch from McCoy and scrambled 23 yards for a score.

McCoy drove Texas to a 21-yard field goal by Hunter Lawrence that made it 50–7 before he was relieved by freshman Garrett Gilbert on Texas' second possession of the third quarter.

Houston

Donald Buckram and Texas-El Paso knocked off the 12th-ranked Cougars in a 58–41 shootout Saturday night.

Keenum completed 51 of 76 passes for 536 yards and five touchdowns.

Donald Buckram ran for 262 yards and four scores, helping the Miners upset the previously unbeaten Cougars.

The Miners had scored 62 points combined in their previous four games but managed 58 on Saturday.

UTEP was ranked 109th in scoring offense and averaged just under 243 yards per game before racking up 58 points and 581 yards of offense (305 rush, 276 pass) against Houston.

Case Keenum led the way for Houston, throwing for 536 yards and five touchdowns. He also finished with 76 pass attempts, seven shy of the FBS record set by Drew Brees.

With the game tied at halftime, the Miners outscored Houston 20–3 in the third quarter and then hung on while Keenum tried to deliver another comeback as he did the week before to knock off the Red Raiders.

Even though Keenum threw three touchdown passes in the fourth quarter, the Miners got three of their own: two on 8- and 27-yard runs by Buckram, and another on Roddray Walker's 70-yard fumble return with 3:25 to play.

Houston outgained UTEP 664–581, but lost two fumbles and twice settled for field goals.

The Cougars got out to a quick 10–0 lead, but after the Miners kicked a field goal, they stopped Houston's potent offense on fourth down at the UTEP 8.

The Miners tied it when they recovered a fumble near midfield and scored on a 4-yard pass from Trevor Vittatoe to Tufick Shadrawy.

Vittatoe was 19 of 30 for 276 yards and two touchdowns. He threw his other scoring pass in the third quarter, a 74-yarder to Jeff Moturi.

Moturi finished with six catches for 127 yards.

Houston's James Cleveland had 14 catches for 147 yards and two touchdowns in a game that featured more than 1,200 yards of total offense and 99 total points.

Memphis

Curtis Steele rushed for 240 yards as Memphis spoiled UTEP’s bid for a fourth straight 2–0 start in Conference USA play with a 35–20 win over the Miners on Saturday in the Liberty Bowl.

The Tigers (2–4, 1–2 C-USA) broke out of a season-long offensive funk with their tailback healthy for the first time in 2009.  Memphis had scored 16 points or less in four of its first five games, the exception a 41–14 rout of UT-Martin.

UTEP left at least three touchdowns on the field due to dropped balls and penalties.

The Miners (2–4, 1–1 C-USA) took a 3–0 lead on a 38-yard field goal by Logan Barrett three minutes into the game.  But Memphis put together two touchdown drives before the first quarter was over and UTEP was playing catch-up the rest of the way.

Despite their struggles in the first half, the Miners trailed only 21–13 at the break.  And they were still within a touchdown after Trevor Vittatoe hooked up with Kris Adams for a 21-yard score with 9:06 to play.  But Memphis answered with a six-play, 53-yard drive over two minutes and 47 seconds, capped by a nine-yard scoring run by Steele.

Vittatoe finished with 319 passing yards after completing 21-of-40 tries.

Tulsa

Donald Buckram ran for 165 yards and two touchdowns, including the go-ahead score with 29 seconds left in the game, to help UTEP beat Conference USA rival Tulsa 28–24 on Wednesday night.

Buckram's two touchdowns were the final scores of the game, one coming with 6:25 left to play and the other a 3-yard run with less than 30 seconds left. Junior quarterback Trevor Vittatoe threw for 271 yards, including one touchdown—an 80-yard pass to Donovan Kemp in the first quarter.

But the Miners managed to hold Tulsa quarterback G.J. Kinne to just 192 yards passing and sacked him five times. Kinne scored one touchdown on a one-yard run early in the fourth quarter. Charles Clay and A.J. Whitmore also each scored touchdowns for the Golden Hurricane (4–3, 2–1 C-USA).

UTEP (3–4, 2–1) came out strong, leading 13–0 after the first quarter, thanks to Vittatoe's touchdown and field goals from Logan Barrett. But the Miners didn't score again until Buckram's TDs in the fourth quarter, watching as Tulsa scored 24 straight points.

Whitmore had a 19-yard TD run early in the second quarter, leaving the Miners with a 13–7 lead at halftime. The Golden Hurricane also had one-yard TD runs from Clay and Kinne and a 24-yard field goal from Kevin Fitzpatrick, and took a 24–13 lead with 12:37 remaining.

Buckram then scored on a 3-yard run, and UTEP scored a two-point conversion to make it 24–21.

Tulsa was coming off a close loss at home to No. 5 Boise State and piled up 791 yards of offense in last year's meeting with the Miners.

UAB

Senior quarterback Joe Webb threw for two touchdowns, ran one and caught a pass for another as Alabama at Birmingham snapped a two-game losing streak and defeated Texas at El Paso 38–33 on Saturday.

UAB moved to 3–5 overall and 3–2 in Conference USA play, while UTEP slipped to 3–5 and 2–2.

Webb scored the first of his TDs with a 53-yard run in the second quarter. A few minutes later he connected with Roddell Carter for a 34-yard scoring pass.

Next, Webb was on the receiving end of a 14-yard TD pass by David Isabelle, also in the second quarter.

Finally, Webb found Mario Wright four a 6-yard touchdown pass in the fourth quarter.

Overall, he finished 313 total yards—172 on 20 rushes, 127 on eight pass completions, and 14 on one reception.

UTEP's Donald Buckram came up with a few ways to score too. He had touchdown runs of 26 and 2 yards, and he caught a 30-yard touchdown pass from Trevor Vittatoe.

Tulane

Tulane's Andre Anderson scored the tying touchdown with one second left in regulation, then rushed for the winning score in overtime as Tulane defeated Texas-El Paso 45–38 on Saturday.

Anderson scored on an 11-yard pass from Ryan Griffin to conclude a nine-play, 86-yard drive and force the extra period, then scored on a 7-yard touchdown run on the first possession of overtime. He finished with 105 yards on 29 carries.

The Miners reached the Green Wave 2-yard line on the ensuing possession, but on fourth down from the 5, Alex Wacha sacked Trevor Vittatoe for a 21-yard loss that ended the game.

Tulane (3–6, 1–4 Conference USA) snapped a four-game losing streak with three road games remaining.

Donald Buckram led the Miners (3–6, 2–3) with four touchdowns. He rushed 34 times for 234 yards and three scores and caught three passes for 109 yards, including a 72-yard touchdown.

SMU

Kyle Padron completed 17 of 24 passes for 244 yards and two touchdowns and added a pair of TD runs to lead the SMU Mustangs to a 35–31 win over the UTEP Miners on Saturday.

SMU (6–4, 5–1 Conference USA) gained sole possession of first place in the conference's West Division after Houston lost 37–32 to Central Florida earlier in the day. The Miners (3–7, 2–4) have lost three straight.

UTEP took a 31–28 lead after running back Donald Buckram scored on a 30-yard screen pass from Trevor Vittatoe with 8:57 left in the game.

But Padron threw a 37-yard touchdown pass to Emmanuel Sanders with 4:34 left in the game to give SMU the lead. UTEP drove to the Mustangs' 14-yard line but Vittatoe was sacked by SMU's Taylor Thompson on fourth-and-6 with 26 seconds left.

Vittatoe finished 23-of-40 for 396 yards, one interception and two touchdowns. Buckram also rushed for 241 yards and one score.

Rice

The Miners came out flying, bolting to leads of 13–0 and 20–10, but the Owls scored 10 points off two turnovers to join in the scoring.

Donald Buckram had three touchdowns, 132 rushing yards and 44 receiving yards heading into the fourth quarter.

The Miner defense opened with three consecutive three-and-outs, while the offense went 66 and 48 yards for scores and a quick 13–0 lead.

Rice got back in the game, going 72 yards for a score to cut its deficit to 13–7, then recovering a fumble at the Miner 19 on the ensuing kickoff. The Owls earned a first down on the 5, but the defense stood and forced a field goal.

UTEP came out flying against Rice Saturday, bolting to a 20–10 halftime lead. Donald Buckram had three touchdowns, 115 rushing yards and 30 receiving yards.

The Miner defense opened with three consecutive three-and-outs, while the offense went 66 and 48 yards for scores and a quick 13–0 lead.

Rice briefly got back in the game, going 72 yards for a score to cut its deficit to 13–7, then recovering a fumble at the Miner 19 on the ensuing kickoff. The Owls earned a first down on the 5, but the defense stood and forced a field goal.

Trevor Vittatoe and Buckram then took UTEP 60 yards in 10 plays to reestablish control. Vittatoe was 9–12 passing in the first half with two drops.

UTEP came out flying against Rice Saturday, bolting to a 13–0 lead. Donald Buckram had two touchdowns, 68 rushing yards and 30 receiving yards.

The Miner defense opened with three consecutive three-and-outs, while the offense went 66 and 48 yards for scores.

Trevor Vittatoe completed all seven passes he attempted

Marshall

Trevor Vittatoe passed for 517 yards and five touchdowns as UTEP routed Marshall 52–21 on Saturday.

Jeff Moturi led receivers with 179 yards, including an 80-yard scoring pass from Vittatoe, who also connected for TDs with Tufick Shadrawy, Kris Adams, Jonny Moore and Donavon Kemp.

James Thomas and Donald Buckram also scored for UTEP on runs of 4 and 12 yards.

Brian Anderson threw for 347 yards and three touchdowns for the Thundering Herd. Anderson found Aaron Dobson, Chuck Walker and Antavio Wilson for scores.

After leading 20–14 at the break, the Miners exploded in the second half, adding four touchdowns and a field goal while holding the Thundering Herd to just one touchdown.

With the victory, the Miners finished the season 4–8 while the Thundering Herd fell to 6–6

The Miners finished the season ranked #102 according to the CBS Sportsline College Football Rankings Website as of December 7, 2009.

References

UTEP
UTEP Miners football seasons
UTEP Miners football